Risa Shinnabe (新鍋 理沙 Shinnabe Risa, born July 11, 1990) is a retired professional Japanese volleyball player who played for Hisamitsu Springs. She also played for the All-Japan women's volleyball team.  She won a bronze medal with the Japanese team at the 2012 Summer Olympics.

She announced her retirement from the sport at the age of 29.

Clubs
  Kanoya-chuo High School
  NobeokaGakuen High School
  Hisamitsu Springs (2009-2020)

National team
  National team (2011-2014)
  National team (2017-2020)

Awards

Individuals
2011 2010-11 V.Premier League - New Face Award
2012 2011-12 V.Premier League - Best Receive Award
2013 2012-13 V.Premier League - Best Receive Award
2013 Kurowashiki All Japan Volleyball Tournament Best6
2014 2013-14 V.Premier League - MVP, Best Serve Receiver, Best6
2014 Yeltsin Cup - Best Server
2017 Asian Women's Volleyball Championship - MVP

Clubs
 2011-2012 V.Premier League -  Runner-Up, with Hisamitsu Springs.
 2012 Empress's Cup -  Champion, with Hisamitsu Springs.
 2012-2013 V.Premier League -  Champion, with Hisamitsu Springs.
 2013 - Japan-Korea V.League Top Match -  Champion, with Hisamitsu Springs.
 2013 - Kurowashiki All Japan Volleyball Tournament -  Champion, with Hisamitsu Springs.
 2013 - Empress's Cup -  Champion, with Hisamitsu Springs.
 2013-2014 V.Premier League -  Champion, with Hisamitsu Springs.
 2014 Asian Club Championship -  Champion, with Hisamitsu Springs.

National team 
2011: Montreux Volley Masters -  Champion
2011:  Silver Medal in the 16th Senior Asian Championship
2011: 4th place in the World Cup in Japan
2012:  Bronze Medal in the Olympic Games of London
2013:  Silver medal in the 17th Asian Women's Volleyball Championship
2017:  Champion in the 19th Asian Women's Volleyball Championship

References

External links
 FIVB Biography
 Japan Volleyball League - Biography
 Hisamitsu Springs - Biography

Japanese women's volleyball players
Living people
1990 births
Volleyball players at the 2012 Summer Olympics
Olympic bronze medalists for Japan
Olympic medalists in volleyball
Olympic volleyball players of Japan
Medalists at the 2012 Summer Olympics
Volleyball players at the 2018 Asian Games
People from Kagoshima Prefecture
Asian Games competitors for Japan